Ridgefield School District may refer to:
Ridgefield School District (Connecticut)
Ridgefield School District (New Jersey)
Ridgefield School District (Washington)